National Route 20 (officially, PY20, better known as Ruta Veinte) is a highway in Paraguay, which runs from San Patricio to Paso de Patria, connecting the southern cities of the departments of Misiones and Ñeembucú. It's currently paved only from San Patricio to Yabebyry.

History
With the Resolution N° 1090/19, it obtained its current number and elevated to National Route in 2019 by the MOPC (Ministry of Public Works and Communications).

Distances, cities and towns

The following table shows the distances traversed by PY20 in each different department, showing cities and towns that it passes by (or near).

References

20